Latgallia is one of the five multi-member constituencies of the Saeima, the national legislature of Latvia. The constituency was established in 1922 when the Saeima was established following Latvia's independence from the Soviet Union. It consists of the cities of Daugavpils and Rēzekne and municipalities of Augšdaugava, Balvi, Krāslava, Līvāni, Ludza, Preiļi and Rēzekne in the region of Latgallia. The constituency currently elects 13 of the 100 members of the Saeima using the open party-list proportional representation electoral system. At the 2022 parliamentary election it had 194,825 registered electors.

Electoral system
Latgallia currently elects 13 of the 100 members of the Saeima using the open party-list proportional representation electoral system. Constituency seats are allocated using the Sainte-Laguë method. Only parties that reach the 5% national threshold compete for constituency seats (4% in 1993).

Election results

Summary

Detailed

2020s

2022
Results of the 2022 parliamentary election held on 1 October 2022:

The following candidates were elected:
Anita Brakovska (ZZS), 17,312 votes; Iļja Ivanovs (S!), 24,476 votes; Līga Kozlovska (ZZS), 17,906 votes; Rihards Kozlovskis (JV), 8,640 votes; Vilis Krištopans (LPV), 9,968 votes; Kaspars Melnis (ZZS), 18,671 votes; Viktorija Pleškāne] (S!), 27,301 votes; Viktors Pučka (S!), 25,028 votes; Anna Rancāne (JV), 8,466 votes; Leila Rasima (PRO), 3,666 votes; Edmunds Teirumnieks (NA), 7,582 votes; Nadežda Tretjakova (S!), 24,478 votes; and Juris Viļums (AS), 6,738 votes.

2010s

2018
Results of the 2018 parliamentary election held on 6 October 2018:

The following candidates were elected:
Aldis Adamovičs (JV), 6,656 votes; Mārtiņš Bondars (AP), 5,219 votes; Jānis Dūklavs (ZZS), 14,720 votes; Inga Goldberga (SDPS), 38,416 votes; Janīna Jalinska (ZZS), 12,912 votes; Jānis Krišāns (SDPS), 35,633 votes; Edgars Kucins (SDPS), 35,803 votes; Janīna Kursīte (KPV LV), 7,789 votes; Vladimirs Nikonovs (SDPS), 35,442 votes; Juris Rancāns (JKP), 8,689 votes; Ivans Ribakovs (SDPS), 38,138 votes; Ilga Šuplinska (JKP), 9,377 votes; Edmunds Teirumnieks (NA), 5,732 votes; and Jānis Tutins (SDPS), 35,267 votes.

2014
Results of the 2014 parliamentary election held on 4 October 2014:

The following candidates were elected:
Aldis Adamovičs (JV), 17,762 votes; Rihards Eigims (ZZS), 20,010 votes; Andrejs Elksniņš (SDPS), 53,658 votes; Marjana Ivanova-Jevsejeva (SDPS), 45,602 votes; Jānis Klaužs (ZZS), 20,370 votes; Inese Laizāne (NA), 6,475 votes; Anrijs Matīss (V), 16,961 votes; Vladimirs Nikonovs (SDPS), 46,040 votes; Ivans Ribakovs (SDPS), 50,621 votes; Raimonds Rubiks (SDPS), 45,493 votes; Silvija Šimfa (NSL), 9,982 votes; Jānis Tutins (SDPS), 47,399 votes; Raimonds Vējonis (ZZS), 20,979 votes; Juris Viļums (LRA), 4,806 votes; and Dzintars Zaķis (V), 17,937 votes.

2011
Results of the 2011 parliamentary election held on 17 September 2011:

The following candidates were elected:
Rihards Eigims (ZZS), 14,654 votes; Gunārs Igaunis (ZRP), 17,258 votes; Marjana Ivanova-Jevsejeva (SC), 64,705 votes; Aleksandrs Jakimovs (SC), 65,586 votes; Jānis Klaužs (ZZS), 14,833 votes; Jānis Lāčplēsis (V), 14,316 votes; Inese Laizāne (NA), 6,704 votes; Jeļena Lazareva (SC), 66,115 votes; Aleksejs Loskutovs (V), 15,395 votes; Vladimirs Nikonovs (SC), 65,458 votes; Ivans Ribakovs (SC), 72,683 votes; Dmitrijs Rodionovs (SC), 65,825 votes; Raimonds Rubiks (SC), 67,810 votes; Jānis Tutins (SC), 70,959 votes; and Juris Viļums (ZRP), 17,552 votes.

2010
Results of the 2010 parliamentary election held on 2 October 2010:

The following candidates were elected:
Imants Jānis Bekešs (PL), 16,267 votes; Aleksejs Burunovs (SC), 62,905 votes; Rihards Eigims (ZZS), 20,164 votes; Sergejs Fjodorovs (SC), 62,650 votes; Aleksandrs Jakimovs (SC), 63,096 votes; Jānis Klaužs (ZZS), 21,835 votes; Inese Laizāne (NA), 4,183 votes; Aleksejs Loskutovs (V), 26,611 votes; Vladimirs Nikonovs (SC), 64,327 votes; Ivans Ribakovs (SC), 71,182 votes; Dmitrijs Rodionovs (SC), 62,053 votes; Raimonds Rubiks (SC), 64,539 votes; Kārlis Šadurskis (V), 20,552 votes; Staņislavs Šķesters (ZZS), 21,733 votes; Rita Strode (PL), 18,177 votes; and Jānis Tutins (SC), 69,362 votes.

2000s

2006
Results of the 2006 parliamentary election held on 7 October 2006:

The following candidates were elected:
Vitālijs Aizbalts (LPP/LC), 20,944 votes; Juris Boldāns (TB/LNNK), 6,559 votes; Jānis Dukšinskis (LPP/LC), 20,963 votes; Jānis Eglītis (TP), 19,971 votes; Sergejs Fjodorovs (SC), 39,125 votes; Aleksandrs Golubovs (SC), 39,754 votes; Sarmīte Ķikuste (JL), 9,416 votes; Jānis Klaužs (TP), 19,746 votes; Anatolijs Mackevičs (LCC/LP), 20,212 votes; Miroslav Mitrofanov (ЗаПЧЕЛ), 12,881 votes; Ivans Ribakovs (SC), 43,577 votes; Anta Rugāte (TP), 20,101 votes; Staņislavs Šķesters (ZZS), 19,374 votes; Jānis Tutins (SC), 41,944 votes; Gunārs Upenieks (ZZS), 17,519 votes; and Aleksejs Vidavskis (SC), 41,250 votes.

2002
Results of the 2002 parliamentary election held on 5 October 2002:

The following candidates were elected:
Aleksandrs Bartaševičs (ЗаПЧЕЛ), 68,646 votes; Martijans Bekasovs (ЗаПЧЕЛ), 66,627 votes; Sergejs Fjodorovs (ЗаПЧЕЛ), 65,853 votes; Aleksandrs Golubovs (ЗаПЧЕЛ), 66,494 votes; Sarmīte Ķikuste (JL), 16,008 votes; Vilis Krištopans (ZZS), 17,819 votes; Anatolijs Mackevičs (ЗаПЧЕЛ), 65,356 votes; Pāvels Maksimovs (ЗаПЧЕЛ), 66,383 votes; Andrejs Naglis (LPP), 10,781 votes; Ināra Ostrovska (JL), 16,049 votes; Ivans Ribakovs (ЗаПЧЕЛ), 67,554 votes; Anta Rugāte (TP), 12,604 votes; Staņislavs Šķesters (ZZS), 17,676 votes; Elita Šņepste (TP), 12,262 votes; Vjačeslavs Stepaņenko (ЗаПЧЕЛ), 67,320 votes; Pēteris Tabūns (TB/LNNK), 6,881 votes; and Aleksejs Vidavskis (ЗаПЧЕЛ), 66,572 votes.

1990s

1998
Results of the 1998 parliamentary election held on 3 October 1998:

The following candidates were elected:
Aleksandrs Bartaševičs (TSP), 71,821 votes; Martijans Bekasovs (TSP), 67,174 votes; Aleksandrs Golubovs (TSP), 67,632 votes; Roberts Jurdžs (TB/LNNK), 8,211 votes; Vanda Kezika (LC), 38,994 votes; Jānis Lāčplēsis (LC), 39,090 votes; Pāvels Maksimovs (TSP), 66,686 votes; Miroslav Mitrofanov (TSP), 69,014 votes; Aija Poča (LC), 40,557 votes; Anta Rugāte (TP), 14,865 votes; Antons Seiksts (LC), 38,748 votes; Jāzeps Šņepsts (TP), 14,961 votes; Helēna Soldatjonoka (LC), 39,259 votes; Leonards Stašs (LSDA), 16,670 votes; Imants Stirāns (JP), 9,193 votes; Oļegs Tolmačovs (TSP), 66,551 votes; Jānis Urbanovičs (TSP), 69,003 votes; and Osvalds Zvejsalnieks (LSDA), 16,681 votes.

1995
Results of the 1995 parliamentary election held on 30 September and 1 October 1995:

The following candidates were elected:
Pēteris Apinis (LC), 24,355 votes; Aleksandrs Bartaševičs (LSP), 31,635 votes; Martijans Bekasovs (LSP), 30,366 votes; Kārlis Čerāns (TKL), 20,245 votes; Aleksandrs Golubovs (LSP), 29,827 votes; Roberts Jurdžs (TB), 5,668 votes; Ernests Jurkāns (DPS), 31,027 votes; Viktors Kalnbērzs (LVP), 16,211 votes; Vilis Krištopans (LC), 24,211 votes; Andrejs Naglis (LZS-KDS-LDP), 12,100 votes; Anta Rugāte (LZS-KDS-LDP), 12,900 votes; Antons Seiksts (LC), 24,186 votes; Leonards Stašs (TSP), 19,950 votes; Viktors Stikuts (DPS), 26,401 votes; Jānis Strods (TKL), 20,721 votes; Pēteris Tabūns (LNNK-LZP), 5,151 votes; Leonards Teniss (DPS), 26,434 votes; Anatolijs Tučs (LVP), 16,036 votes; and Jānis Urbanovičs (TSP), 19,880 votes.

1993
Results of the 1993 parliamentary election held on 5 and 6 June 1993:

The following candidates were elected:
Martijans Bekasovs (Р), 35,501 votes; Aleksandrs Bartaševičs (Р), 35,924 votes; Vilnis Edvīns Bresis (SL), 48,559 votes; Imants Daudišs (LC), 55,284 votes; Galina Fedorova (Р), 38,078 votes; Irēna Folkmane (SL), 48,865 votes; Ernests Jurkāns (SL), 50,876 votes; Jānis Jurkāns (SL), 68,688 votes; Andris Ķesteris (LC), 52,759 votes; Jānis Kokins (LZS), 20,965 votes; Vilis Krištopans (LC), 52,307 votes; Janīna Kušnere (LNNK); 10,612 votes; Andris Līgotnis (LC), 52,926 votes; Voldemārs Novakšāns (LZS), 22,407 votes; Andris Piebalgs (LC), 52,788 votes; Anta Rugāte (KDS), 11,562 votes; Antons Seiksts (LC), 52,902 votes; Leonards Stašs (SL), 51,028 votes; Filips Stroganovs (Р), 36,755 votes; and Jānis Vaivads (LC), 52,784 votes.

1930s

1931
Results of the 1931 parliamentary election held on 3 and 4 October 1931:

1920s

1928
Results of the 1928 parliamentary election held on 6 and 7 October 1928:

1925
Results of the 1925 parliamentary election held on 3 and 4 October 1925:

1922
Results of the 1922 parliamentary election held on 7 and 8 October 1922:

References

Saeima constituency
Saeima constituencies
Saeima constituencies established in 1922